Joseph R. Zeller (September 19, 1918 – December 12, 2018) was an American politician who was a Democratic member of the Pennsylvania House of Representatives.

Biography 
Joseph Zeller was born in Campus, Illinois. He went to Pennsylvania State University and served in the United States Navy. Zeller worked in the fire protection apparatus business. He served on the Emmaus, Pennsylvania council and as mayor. He died at the age of 100 in 2018.

References

1918 births
2018 deaths
Mayors of places in Pennsylvania
Pennsylvania city council members
Democratic Party members of the Pennsylvania House of Representatives
People from Lehigh County, Pennsylvania
People from Livingston County, Illinois
Military personnel from Illinois
Pennsylvania State University alumni
Businesspeople from Pennsylvania
American centenarians
Men centenarians
20th-century American businesspeople